Turn Style was a chain of discount department stores and was a division of Chicago-based Jewel, the parent company of the Jewel Food Stores supermarket chain. Some mid-western Turn Styles had an Osco Pharmacy, at the time very uncommon for a discount store in the 1960s and 1970s. At its peak, the chain comprised more than fifty stores throughout Chicago, as well as in downstate Illinois, Decatur, Illinois, Moline, Illinois; Davenport, Iowa; Omaha, Nebraska; Boston, Massachusetts;
Merrillville, Indiana; Michigan, and Racine, Wisconsin.

History

Turn Style was a Brighton, Massachusetts-based discount department store chain that was founded by Harold Sparks who had open his first store in Lynn, Massachusetts in 1957. This was the first discount department store that had opened in the state of Massachusetts and the second in New England following the opening of Topps which had just opened 7 months earlier in neighboring Connecticut. Other locations were quickly open in Massachusetts in  Brighton (1958), Lawrence (1960), and Medford (1961).

Jewel acquired the Turn Style brand in 1961 and began rapidly expanding the chain.  Sales for the 1961 year were listed as $14 million U.S. dollars with four stores, with headquarters in Brighton, Massachusetts. At its peak, the chain operated throughout the Midwest, as well as in the Boston, Massachusetts area. Within three years of opening a store in Racine, Wisconsin, profits as measured on a ROI basis were the highest within Jewel Companies. Rapid expansion, the corporate decision to incorporate a catalog type store within its four walls, and an unrealistic divisive venture into the "Hypermarket" business, all caused profits to suffer.

The economy also caused Jewel to rethink its growth strategy and the decision was made to sell Turn Style in order to concentrate its growth within its core businesses, which were food stores and drugstores. In 1978, 19 out of 22 of the existing stores were sold to May Department Stores and converted to the Venture format. Other stores were converted to large Osco Drug Stores, and some were closed entirely.

References

Defunct discount stores of the United States
Retail companies established in 1957
Retail companies disestablished in 1978
1957 establishments in Massachusetts
1978 disestablishments in Massachusetts